Richard Devine is an Atlanta-based electronic musician and sound designer. He is recognized for producing a layered and heavily processed sound, combining influences from glitch music to old and modern electronic music. Devine largely records for the Miami-based Schematic Records, which was founded by Josh Kay of Phoenecia. He has also done extensive recording and sample work with Josh Kay under the name DEVSND. As a result of praise of his music from Autechre as well as a remix of Aphex Twin's "Come to Daddy", Devine recorded an album for Warp Records which was jointly released by Schematic and Warp.

Devine first started using computers for composition around 1993. Don Hassler, an instructor at the Atlanta College of Art, got him interested in computer synthesis, introducing Devine to Csound and other powerful computer-based applications. Devine coded his own FFT applications in SuperCollider, an environment and programming language for real-time audio synthesis. “It’s interesting, because you’re doing things to sound that just aren’t physically possible.”

Devine also uses Native Instruments (NI) software and has used Propellerhead ReBirth RB-338 and Reason. His favorite NI applications are Reaktor and Absynth. Devine has designed sound patches for Propellerhead's Reason, NI’s Absynth, Reaktor, Battery and Massive, along with providing sound patches to Moog Music's award-winning Animoog app. As a sound designer, he collaborated with electronic musician BT in the film Look. He has also scored commercials for Nike, Touchstone Pictures and engineered and performed his own music worldwide.

Though he has contributed sound design to a number of hardware and software manufacturers, he recently released his first official sample library through Sony Creative Software entitled "The Electronic Music Manuscript: A Richard Devine Collection".

He made additional contributions for the video games Doom and Cyberpunk 2077.

Discography
 Sculpt (1995) (Tape)
 Richard Coleman Devine EP (1997) (Schematic SCH005 12")
 Lipswitch (2000) (Schematic/Warp SCH015/WAP139 LP CD)
 Aleamapper (2001) (Schematic SCH019 LP CD)
 Asect:Dsect (2003) (Schematic SCH023 LP CD)
 Cautella (2005) (Sublight SLR601 CD)
 RISP (2012) (Detroit Underground)
 Sort\Lave (2018) (Timesig)
 Systik (2020) (BLK_Noise)

References

External links
 Devine Sound
 Schematic Records
 Warp Records
 Sublight Records, Inc.

American electronic musicians
Ableton Live users
Intelligent dance musicians
Living people
Year of birth missing (living people)